Can't Love, Can't Hurt is the second album by Augustana, a California rock band. The album was released on April 29, 2008, by Epic Records. The album debuted at number 21 on the U.S. Billboard 200 chart, selling over 21,000 copies in its first week.

An iTunes exclusive EP was released on February 26, 2008 to promote the album featuring the first three tracks from the album.

Track listing
All songs written by Dan Layus and Mike Flynn.

Regular edition
 "Hey Now" – 4:39
 "I Still Ain't Over You" – 3:31
 "Sweet and Low" – 3:34
 "Twenty Years" – 4:27
 "Meet You There" – 3:14
 "Fire" – 2:31
 "Either Way, I'll Break Your Heart Someday" – 4:11
 "Dust" – 5:04
 "Rest, Shame, Love" – 3:59
 "Where Love Went Wrong" – 5:31
 "I'll Stay" – 3:38
 "Sweet and Low" (acoustic) – 3:21
 "Sweet and Low" (music video) – 3:32
 "Hey Now" (acoustic music video) – 4:14
 "Reasons" – 3:29
 Deluxe edition bonus tracks.

Personnel

Musicians

 Dan Layus – vocals, guitars, piano
 Jared Palomar – bass guitar, vocals
 Justin South – drums, percussion, vocals
 Chris Sachtleben - guitars, mandolin, vocals
 John Fredericks – piano, keyboards, guitars, vocals

Production

 Produced by Mike Flynn
 Co-Produced and Engineered by Warren Huart
 Strings arranged & conducted by David Campbell
 Recorded at The Pass Studios in Los Angeles, CA
 Assisted by Zeph Sowers and Bo Joe
 Mixed by Jim Scott at PLYRZ Studios, Assisted by Kevin Dean

EP track listing 
 "Sweet and Low"
 "Hey Now"
 "I Still Ain't Over You"

References

2008 albums
Augustana (band) albums
Epic Records albums
Albums produced by Warren Huart